George Hodgson may refer to:

 George Hodgson ( 1751), English brewer - see India pale ale
 George Harris Hodgson (1839–1917), English cricketer
 George Henry Hodgson (1817–1848), English Royal Navy officer and polar explorer
 George Ritchie Hodgson (1893–1983), Canadian swimmer